Armageddon was the only album released by British/American progressive rock group Armageddon in 1975. It features vocalist Keith Relf (of The Yardbirds and Renaissance), Martin Pugh (lead guitarist for Rod Stewart's An Old Raincoat Won't Ever Let You Down and Steamhammer), Louis Cennamo (bassist and bandmate of Relf's in Renaissance and Pugh's in Steamhammer), and  Bobby Caldwell (drummer for Captain Beyond and Johnny Winter).

History
Armageddon was the last band to feature The Yardbirds' (the band that launched Eric Clapton, Jeff Beck and Jimmy Page) vocalist Keith Relf. He had founded Renaissance after the dissolution of The Yardbirds in 1968, and left Renaissance after two albums (actually half way through the second album) - to produce bands like Medicine Head (for whom he also played bass), Hunter Muskett and Saturnalia.

Pugh and Cennamo had broken up Steamhammer in 1973 - they then decided, with Relf (who had assisted them in the production of the final Steamhammer LP), to leave England for L.A. They tried out a few drummers in California, and decided upon drummer Bobby Caldwell to complete the Armageddon lineup.

According to the booklet in the Repertoire Records CD reissue of the album in 2001, Frampton and Dee Anthony recommended Armageddon to A&M Records, and it is likely that because he was their top selling artist at the time, they agreed to sign the band.

Although the group's self-titled album was well received by critics and fans, the band did not tour to support it - consequently, sales suffered, and Relf returned to England due to poor health shortly after the album was released. He died shortly after returning to England, when he was electrocuted while playing guitar, although he did record one more song "All the Falling Angels" that is included on an album by Illusion called Enchanted Caress.  (Illusion was the name the original members of Renaissance chose when they reunited, as the Annie Haslam incarnation of that band was still active at that time). After Armageddon folded, bassist Cennamo reunited with his Renaissance bandmates (the aforementioned Illusion), and later worked with Jim McCarty in the bands Stairway and Renaissance Illusion. Drummer Caldwell returned to Captain Beyond for an album and tour - and although guitarist Pugh appears to have retired from music after 1975, he did emerge to play guitar on sessions alongside legendary American rock guitarist Geoff Thorpe of Vicious Rumors in American rock & roll band, 7th Order on their debut CD, The Lake of Memory - released on the Big Island Sounds label in 2007.

Track listing

Personnel
Armageddon 
Keith Relf - lead vocals, harmonica
Martin Pugh - electric and acoustic guitars
Louis Cennamo - bass, electric bowed bass
Bobby Caldwell - drums, percussion, piano, backing vocals

References

External links
Armageddon

1975 debut albums
Armageddon (British band) albums
A&M Records albums
Albums recorded at Olympic Sound Studios